Football Réunis de Saint-Marcel is a French football club based in Saint-Marcel in the Bourgogne region. The original incarnation of the club was founded in the 1940s under the name Sports Réunis de Saint-Marcel. On 26 May 1988, the club merged with Football Club de Saint-Marcel to form the club that exists today. Saint-Marcel currently plays in the Championnat de France amateur 2, the fifth division of French football, after achieving promotion from the Division d'Honneur in the 2009–10 season.

References

External links
 Official site

Association football clubs established in 1988
1988 establishments in France
Sport in Saône-et-Loire
Football clubs in Bourgogne-Franche-Comté